San Pedrito is a station on Line A of the Buenos Aires Underground and it is the current terminus of the line. The station was opened on 27 September 2013 as a part of the extension of the line from Carabobo.

References

External links

Buenos Aires Underground stations
2013 establishments in Argentina
Railway stations opened in 2013